Richard S. Sutton  is a Canadian computer scientist. He is a distinguished research scientist at DeepMind and a professor of computing science at the University of Alberta. Sutton is considered one of the founders of modern computational reinforcement learning, having several significant contributions to the field, including temporal difference learning and policy gradient methods.

Life and education
Richard Sutton was born in Ohio, and grew up in Oak Brook, Illinois, a suburb of Chicago.

Sutton received his B.A. in psychology from Stanford University in 1978 before taking an M.S. (1980) and Ph.D. (1984) in computer science from the University of Massachusetts Amherst under the supervision of Andrew Barto. His doctoral dissertation, Temporal Credit Assignment in Reinforcement Learning, introduced actor-critic architectures and temporal credit assignment.

Career
In 1984, Sutton was a postdoctoral researcher at the University of Massachusetts.

From 1985 to 1994, he was a principal member of technical staff in the Computer and Intelligent Systems Laboratory at GTE in Waltham, Massachusetts. In 1995, he returned to the University of Massachusetts as a senior research scientist.

From 1998 to 2002, Sutton worked at the AT&T Shannon Laboratory in Florham Park, New Jersey as principal technical staff member in the artificial intelligence department.

Since 2003, he has been a professor of computing science at the University of Alberta. He led the institution's Reinforcement Learning and Artificial Intelligence Laboratory until 2018.

While retaining his professorship, Sutton joined Deepmind in June 2017 as a distinguished research scientist and co-founder of its new Edmonton office.

Sutton became a Canadian citizen in 2015 and renounced his US citizenship in 2017.

In a 2019 essay, Sutton criticized the field of AI research for failing "to learn the bitter lesson that building in how we think we think does not work in the long run", arguing that "70 years of AI research [had shown] that general methods that leverage computation are ultimately the most effective, and by a large margin", beating efforts building on human knowledge about specific fields like computer vision, speech recognition, chess or Go.

Selected publications
 Sutton, R. S., Barto, A. G., Reinforcement Learning: An Introduction. MIT Press, 1998. Also translated into Japanese and Russian. Second edition MIT Press 2018.
 Miller, W. T., Sutton, R. S., Werbos, P. J. (Eds.), Neural Networks for Control. MIT Press, 1991.
 Sutton, R. S. (Ed.), Reinforcement Learning. Reprinting of a special issue of Machine Learning Journal. Kluwer Academic Press, 1992

Awards and honors
Sutton is fellow of the Association for the Advancement of Artificial Intelligence (AAAI) since 2001.  In 2003 he received the President's Award from the International Neural Network Society and in 2013, the Outstanding Achievement in Research award from the University of Massachusetts Amherst.

Sutton's nomination as a AAAI fellow reads:

In 2021, Sutton was elected Fellow of the Royal Society.

References

External links
Richard Sutton's Homepage

Year of birth missing (living people)
Living people
Canadian computer scientists
Academic staff of the University of Alberta
Fellows of the Association for the Advancement of Artificial Intelligence
Stanford University alumni
University of Massachusetts Amherst alumni
Artificial intelligence researchers
Canadian Fellows of the Royal Society